Richard (Dick) Green is Director of Liberty Global Corporation, Shaw Communications Inc., and currently serves as chairman of the Space Sciences Institute and the University of Colorado Boulder's ATLAS Institute in Boulder, Colorado. He previously served as president and CEO of not-for-profit research and development consortium CableLabs.

Green began his career in research as an assistant professor at the University of Washington. During his residency in Seattle, he also served as a Senior Member of the Technical Staff of the Geo-Astrophysics Laboratory, a component of the Boeing Scientific Research Laboratory. In that role he published numerous articles on lunar and planetary subjects including a study of lunar geo-morphology in 1969.

Following a move to Los Angeles, Green became a Department Manager in the Laser Division of the Hughes Aircraft Company, before beginning his career in television as manager of ABC’s Video Tape Post Production Department in Hollywood in 1977. Green served briefly as Director of Engineering at Times Fiber Communications in 1979 developing technology for cabling of fiber- and electro-optic and laser technology for application in cable television distribution before accepting the role of director of the CBS Advanced Television Technology Laboratory in 1980. During his time at CBS, Green worked to develop digital and high definition television technology and helped to organize and establish the Advanced Television Systems Committee (ATSC), a multi-industry-supported organization founded to develop voluntary national standards for advanced television, where he held the position of executive director until 1983.

Following his work with the ATSC, Green acted as senior vice president of Broadcast Operations and Engineering at the Public Broadcasting Service where his contributions included construction of national network origination and transmission facilities until the founding of CableLabs in 1988. There, Green served as president and CEO. Green's instituted and managed key technology projects that helped the cable industry develop new services and achieve standardization and interoperability among multiple industry companies and suppliers.  Green retired from CableLabs in 2008. He received the Charles F. Jenkins Lifetime Achievement Emmy Award in 2012. In recognition for his achievements in broadcast television and cable, Green received the Charles G. Jenkins Lifetime Achievement Emmy Award in 2012.

Telecommunications standards 
Green has been actively involved in a number of standards-setting efforts within the telecommunication industry; including the establishment of guidelines governing the management of HDTV signals, the creation of the Advanced Television Systems Committee (ATSC), and the Data Over Cable Service Interface Specification.

Green has also chaired numerous Committees in the International Communication Union (ITU) including the US team behind ITU-R Recommendation BT.601, a worldwide television standard for digital signals, and ITU-T Study Group 9; the group behind the ITU's recommendations concerning voice, data and video IP applications over CATV networks (IPCablecom), interactive cable television service, high-speed data services, and IP-based video distribution.

Education 

Education:
BS degree from Colorado College (1959)
MS in physics from the State University of New York in Albany (1964)
PhD from the University of Washington (1968)

Honors and awards 

2012 Charles F. Jenkins Lifetime Achievement Emmy Award
2008 Cable Hall of Fame 
 2001 Technology Leadership Award
1999 NCTA Vanguard Award for Science & Technology
1996 Colorado College Louis T. Benezet Award
1993 ElectronicMedia's "12 people in the U.S. media to watch"
1991 CED Magazine's Man of the Year 1991

Publications 

Astrophysics publications:
"An Analysis of Distribution of the Thermal Anomalies on Eclipsed Moon." Transactions-American Geophysical Union 49 (2):520 (1968)
An Analysis of the Distribution of the Major Surface Characteristics and the Thermal Anomalies Observed on the Eclipsed Moon. Seattle: Boeing Scientific Research Laboratories, Geo-Astrophysics Laboratory, 1969.
"A Stochastic Model of Distribution of Lunar Thermal Anomalies." & "Relative Dating of the Lunar Surface". Transactions-American Geophysical Union 50(2):61 (1969)
Ronca, Luciano B., and Richard R. Green. "Large-scale Evolution of the Lunar Surface."Astrophysics and Space Science 3.4 (1969): 564-78.
Ronca, L. B., and R. R. Green. "Aeolian Regime of the Surface of Venus." Astrophysics and Space Science 8.1 (1970): 59–65.
Ronca, L. B., and R. R. Green. "Statistical Geomorphology of the Lunar Surface." Geological Society of America Bulletin 81.2 (1970): 337.
Engineering publications:
Mirachi, M., and R. Green. "Military Laser Range Finding--A Status Report." IEEE Journal of Quantum Electronics 5.6 (1969): 327.
Richard, Green R., and Morass F. Dwight. "Production Experience in High Definition Television." Society of Motion Picture and Television Engineers, Journal (1984): 169–74.
Future Challenges for Cable Television: Lectures in Cable Television. [University Park, Pa.]: National Cable Television Center and Museum in Association with College of Engineering, the Pennsylvania State University, 1990.

References 

Living people
American computer businesspeople
University of Colorado Boulder faculty
American technology company founders
Year of birth missing (living people)
University of Washington faculty
Primetime Emmy Engineering Award winners